The Royal Air Force Centre for Air Power Studies (RAF CAPS) is a Royal Air Force sponsored think tank which engages in the study of air power.

The centre was launched on 23 August 2007 by Air Chief Marshal Sir Glenn Torpy, Chief of the Air Staff. Based at the Royal Air Force College, this think tank and research centre claims to bring together academia with serving members of the RAF to analyse how air power has been used in the past and how best it might be used in a modern, complex world of increasing ambiguity. It aspires to act as the RAF’s centre for strategic and conceptual thinking about air power, to "encourage and promote the study of air power, particularly within the Service and academia, but also throughout the broader intellectual community (including the media and think-tanks)".

The centre hosts a website, runs major conferences, offers fellowships and, since 2008, publishes a journal called Air Power Review. Its board is headed by the Air Officer Commanding No. 22 (Training) Group. Its staff consists of key members of the Royal Air Force, the Air Historical Branch (RAF), and academics from King's College London's Air Power Studies Division.  In 2009 the RAF CAPS worked with a King's College team of air power experts under the direction of Dr Joel Hayward to develop the UK's first specialised master's degree in air power studies.

The Chief of the Air Staff's Air Power Workshop, sometimes known merely as the CAS Workshop, is a small working group of senior scholars and other theorists convened by the Chief of Air Staff, the professional head of the Royal Air Force. Run by the successive Directors of Defence Studies (RAF), the Workshop develops and debates cutting-edge ideas on air power and sporadically produces books containing the findings.

Notes

External links
 Royal Air Force Centre for Air Power Studies: official website.

British defence policymaking
Education in Lincolnshire
Foreign policy and strategy think tanks based in the United Kingdom
Military education and training in the United Kingdom
North Kesteven District
Organisations based in Lincolnshire
Royal Air Force